Xu Hang (born 1967) is a Chinese billionaire business magnate and philanthropist. He is the co-founder and co-CEO of the Shenzhen-based multinational medical instrumentation manufacturer Mindray Medical International.

Xu Hang holds a BA degree from Tsinghua University. Later he did his MA in biomedical engineering at the Department of Electrical Engineering of Tsinghua. After graduation, Xu Hang became famous for inventing China's first domestic color B-ultrasound machine, for which he even won the National Progress Award. In 2001, Xu Hang also established Pengrui Investment Group Co., Ltd which focuses on high-tech environmental protection, real estate and ecotourism project development. In 2012, he resigned from the co-CEO position of Minday but continued serving as the chairman of the company.

Xu Hang made the 2022 Forbes Billionaires List with an estimated wealth of US$16.1 billion and occupied the 113th position in the world.

References 

1967 births
Living people
Chinese businesspeople
Chinese billionaires
20th-century Chinese businesspeople
21st-century Chinese businesspeople